Charles J. Stewart (1898–1987) was the first chairman of Manufacturers Hanover Trust Company.

Early life

Stewart was raised in Dallas, Texas and graduated from the Terrill School for Boys in 1914. He went to Yale University, where he was a running back on the varsity football team for three years. He captained the Yale's 1917 football team and graduated in 1918. Upon graduation, he enlisted in the U.S. Army and served as a second lieutenant in World War I.

Early career

Stewart returned to Dallas after the war and began a real estate career. He joined the commercial banking department of the New York Trust Company in 1930 and worked his way up the ladder. By 1949, he was president of the company.

Later career

In 1952, Stewart led the proposed merger of New York Trust with Manufacturers Trust Company. That merger was stymied by his own stockholders, and Stewart resigned to become a general partner at Lazard Freres, an investment bank.

In 1961, Manufacturers Trust did merge with Hanover Bank, and Stewart became the first chairman of Manufacturers Hanover Trust, which became the nation's fourth largest commercial bank. Elected chair, he served in that capacity until his retirement in 1963.

Personal life
He and his wife, Clothide, had one son and one daughter.

References

1898 births
1987 deaths
People from Dallas
Yale University alumni